Ronchetti is a surname. Notable people with the surname include:

Giancarlo Ronchetti (1913–?), Italian bobsledder
Liliana Ronchetti (1927–1974), Italian basketball player
Lucia Ronchetti (born 1963), Italian composer
Mark Ronchetti (born 1973), New Mexico politician

See also
Ronchetti Cup

Italian-language surnames